Le Manoir (also known as Le Manoir-sur-Seine) is a commune in the Eure department in Normandy in northern France.

Population

Communication routes and transport 
The town is crossed by the railway line from Paris to Rouen by means of the Manoir viaduct.

Hydrography 
The town is crossed by the Seine.

Climate

See also

Communes of the Eure department

References

Communes of Eure